Constituency name	Tirora

Controversy
Rahangdale was involved in an agitation against Chief Executive Officer of the Gondia Zilla Parishad, Yeshwant Gedam accusing him of corruption. The agitators declared that they would stall proceedings from 13 December 2012 unless Gedam was transferred after the intervention of the then state Chief Minister, Prithviraj Chavan. After he was transferred Gedam filed a case against Rahangdale and two others, accusing them of physical violence against him. A case was filed under the Scheduled Caste and Scheduled Tribe (Prevention of Atrocities) Act, 1989 against him. He was arrested on 16 December 2012. He was released on bail on 19 December 2012.

References

Maharashtra MLAs 2014–2019
Bharatiya Janata Party politicians from Maharashtra
Living people
People from Gondia district
Maharashtra district councillors
Marathi politicians
Year of birth missing (living people)